Ridha El Louze (born 27 April 1953) is a Tunisian football defender who played for Tunisia in the 1978 FIFA World Cup. He also played for Sfax Railways Sports.

References

External links
FIFA profile

1953 births
Living people
Tunisian footballers
Tunisia international footballers
Association football defenders
Sfax Railways Sports players
1978 FIFA World Cup players
1978 African Cup of Nations players